Emil J. Kang (born 1968 in New York City) serves as Program Director for Arts and Cultural Heritage at The Andrew W. Mellon Foundation where he leads the Foundation’s grant making program. Kang assumed the role in 2019.

From 2005 to 2019, Kang was at The University of North Carolina at Chapel Hill as the University’s first Executive Director for the Arts, a senior administrative post created to help unify and elevate the performing arts at the University. In his first season, Emil Kang introduced the University’s first major performing arts series, inaugurated in conjunction with the grand re-opening of the University’s main performing arts venue, Memorial Hall. Emil Kang also taught courses in arts leadership, artistic entrepreneurship and performance studies. Kang was also a member of the music faculty and served as Professor of the Practice.

In May 2016, Kang was also appointed Special Assistant to the Chancellor for the Arts at UNC-Chapel Hill.

In 2012, President Barack Obama nominated Kang as a Member of the National Council on the Arts. He replaced Benjamin Donenberg, whose term was expiring. Kang's term will last until September 3, 2018.

He currently serves as a member of the board of directors of the Martha Graham Dance Company and the International Society of the Performing Arts. Kang has served on the boards of EMCarts, the Association of Performing Arts Professionals (APAP), North Carolina Symphony the Thomas S. Kenan Institute for the Arts at the University of North Carolina School of the Arts.

Prior to coming to Chapel Hill, Emil Kang served as President and Executive Director of the Detroit Symphony Orchestra (DSO). Kang was the youngest and first Asian-American to hold the top administrative post of a major symphony orchestra. Emil Kang has also held positions of Vice President of Operations for the DSO, Orchestra Manager for the Seattle Symphony, and Orchestra Management Fellow with the American Symphony Orchestra League (ASOL). As an Orchestra Management Fellow, Kang worked with symphony orchestras in San Francisco, Houston, and Grand Rapids, Michigan.

References

External links
"Your First Classical Music Crush" - The New York Times on July 18, 2013
"UNC Arts Director Sets His Own Path" - News and Observer
"Meet Emil Kang, 'Elevating the Arts'" - WUNC North Carolina Public Radio
"Indies Arts Awards: Carolina Performing Arts’ Emil Kang brings the global avant-garde to Chapel Hill through personal determination"
UNC-Chapel Hill names Emil J. Kang Special Assistant to the Chancellor for the Arts

University of North Carolina at Chapel Hill faculty
Living people
1968 births